The Nacoochee Valley Historic District is in White County, Georgia. The valley is enclosed by Mount Yonah, and Sal Mountain. Manmade objects in the valley span centuries. The most obvious Native American artifact is the Nacoochee Mound at the western edge of the valley, which is 17 feet tall and 70 feet in diameter. There are structures throughout the district since the settlement of European people in the 1820s.  The Richardson-Lumsden house and the Williams-Dyer Residence date from the early period of settlement by European people. The most elaborate structure is the Nichols-Hunnicutt-Hardman House. The area was added to the National Register of Historic Places in 1980. It is adjacent to the Sautee Valley Historic District.

References

Historic districts on the National Register of Historic Places in Georgia (U.S. state)
Gothic Revival architecture in Georgia (U.S. state)
National Register of Historic Places in White County, Georgia
Native American history of Georgia (U.S. state)